The 1989 season is the 3rd season of the league that began on January 7, 1989 and concluded with the championship game on April 7.

Team movement
1989 saw the MILL expand by two teams: the New England Blazers and the Detroit Turbos. The New Jersey Saints also moved to Long Island, New York, becoming the New York Saints.

Regular season

Playoffs

* indicates an overtime period.

Awards

Statistics leaders
Bold numbers indicate new single-season records. Italics indicate tied single-season records.

See also
 1989 in sports
 1989 Philadelphia Wings

References
1989 Archive at the Outsider's Guide to the NLL

MILL
Major Indoor Lacrosse League seasons